The women's time trial class C1-3 track cycling event at the 2020 Summer Paralympics took place on 27 August 2021 at the Izu Velodrome, Japan. This combine class of (C1-3) under classification C is for cyclists who have impairments that affect their legs, arms, and/or trunk but are still capable to use a standard bicycle. Ten cyclists from six nations competed in this event.

Competition format
The competition immediately began with the finals, where the 10 cyclists competed individually in their own heat by doing a time trial basis where the fastest cyclist won gold, the second fastest a silver, and the third fastest a bronze. The distance of this event was 500m. Cyclists may have had a different official time than their real-time due to this event being a combined class event (C1-3), and some cyclists in their own class may have a disadvantage over other classes (for example due to speed), thus athlete factor was used where those in C1 has 91.95, C2 92.45 and C3 100.00. The time cyclist from class C3 gets will be their official time while those in C1 and 2 can have it lesser due to the factor.

Schedule
All times are Japan Standard Time (UTC+9)

Records
Women's C1 500m Time Trial

Women's C2 500m Time Trial

Women's C3 500m Time Trial

Results

References

Women's time trial C1-3